Brand New Bein is the 4th album by Brand Nubian member Sadat X, and the second to be released in less than a year's time. The album is fully produced by the Rocksteady Crew's DJ JS-One and JW and features guest appearances from CL Smooth, KRS-One, C-Rayz Walz, Craig G, and Brand Nubian amongst others.

Track listing

References 

2009 albums
Sadat X albums
Loud Records albums